Sir Con Douglas Walter O'Neill  (3 June 1912 – 11 January 1988) was a British civil servant and diplomat. He was the British Ambassador to China (1955–1957) and the British Ambassador to Finland (1961–1963). He was also the British representative to the European Economic Community from 1963 to 1965 and led the British delegation which negotiated the country's entry to the EEC.

O'Neill was the second son of an Ulster Unionist MP, Hugh O'Neill, 1st Baron Rathcavan. He studied first at Eton College, then at Balliol College, Oxford. He gained a fellowship at All Souls College, Oxford, in 1935 before joining the Diplomatic Service in 1936.

In 1939, with the outbreak of the Second World War, he entered the Army Intelligence Corps. He joined the German Section of the Political Warfare Executive, during which time he interrogated Adolf Hitler's former deputy, Rudolf Hess. He left the army for the Foreign Office in 1943. During 1946 and 1947 he was a leader writer for The Times. He re-entered the foreign service in 1948.

O'Neill died on 11 January 1988. His daughter Onora is now Baroness O'Neill of Bengarve.

References

1912 births
1988 deaths
Ambassadors of the United Kingdom to China
Ambassadors of the United Kingdom to Finland
Permanent Representatives of the United Kingdom to the European Union
Alumni of Balliol College, Oxford
People educated at Eton College
Fellows of All Souls College, Oxford
Intelligence Corps officers
Younger sons of barons
Knights Grand Cross of the Order of St Michael and St George